Gregory Ducre (born January 22, 1992) is an American football cornerback for the Calgary Stampeders of the Canadian Football League (CFL). He played college football at the University of Washington. He signed with the San Diego Chargers as an undrafted free agent in 2014. He has also been a member of the Washington Redskins and San Diego Fleet.

Professional career

San Diego Chargers
On May 10, 2014, Ducre signed with the San Diego Chargers after going unselected in the 2014 NFL Draft. He was waived by the team on August 30 for final roster cuts, but was signed to their practice squad the next day.

Washington Redskins
The Washington Redskins signed Ducre off the Chargers' practice squad on October 8, 2014. He recorded his first career interception against San Francisco 49ers quarterback Colin Kaepernick after filling in for an injured Tracy Porter, who started in place for an inactive David Amerson. He was released by the team on December 9, 2014.

Second stint with Chargers
After being released by the Redskins, the Chargers signed Ducre to their practice squad. He was promoted to the active roster on December 15, 2014.

BC Lions
Ducre signed to the BC Lions practice roster October 18, 2016, but was allowed to try out with the Indianapolis Colts during October.

Pittsburgh Steelers
On January 30, 2017, Ducre signed a reserve/future contract with the Pittsburgh Steelers. He was waived/injured by the Steelers on August 23, 2017 and placed on injured reserve.

San Diego Fleet
On October 14, 2018, Ducre signed with the San Diego Fleet. The league ceased operations in April 2019.

Calgary Stampeders
Ducre signed with the Calgary Stampeders on January 25, 2021.

References

External links
 Washington Huskies bio
 San Diego Chargers bio

1992 births
Living people
American football cornerbacks
Canadian football defensive backs
American players of Canadian football
San Diego Chargers players
San Diego Fleet players
Washington Huskies football players
Washington Redskins players
BC Lions players
Pittsburgh Steelers players
Montreal Alouettes players
Players of American football from Los Angeles
Crenshaw High School alumni
Calgary Stampeders players
Players of Canadian football from Los Angeles